Paull Holme Tower is an unusual late-medieval fortified tower in the East Riding of Yorkshire, England.

History
The tower is part of a rectangular, moated enclosure near the village of Paull, dating from the beginning of the 15th century. The tower is three storeys high, each floor having a single chamber, the whole protected by a portcullis entrance. There has been debate as to the purpose of the site - in part the fortification resembles the more northern pele towers, although alternatively the tower may have been built to give luxury accommodation overlooking the River Humber which runs nearby, similar to some properties built near King's Lynn. It is a unique building for the period and region.

The tower was restored in 1871, from which the current windows, doorways and plasterwork dates, but has been roofless since the early 20th century and as of 2010 is ruined and in what English Heritage considers to be a very bad condition.  It is a scheduled monument and a Grade I listed building.

In December 2016 a grant of £160,000 was secured from Historic England to enable restoration work to begin with an aim of completing the work by September 2017.

A shield of arms is displayed on the outer wall.

See also
Castles in Great Britain and Ireland
List of castles in England

References

Bibliography

External links

Website: https://paullholmetower.org.uk
Facebook: https://facebook.com/paullholmetower
Vimeo: https://vimeo.com/user53765211

Grade I listed buildings in the East Riding of Yorkshire